Syanri is a village in Patti Bhardar, Rudraprayag District, state of Uttarakhand, India.

Location

Transport
Syanri is well connected through a motorable road with Srinagar via Badiyar garh and Rudraprayag.

Places in and around the village
 
"Augustya Muni Maharaj Temple" - located centrally in the village. It is believed that Augustya Muni, great saint of Indian mythology once visited this place, was awestruck by the scenic beauty of the place decided to meditate (Tapasya) where an old temple is located now.

"Nagarja Temple" (deity of snakes/serpents), is a small open temple located away from the main village and is worshipped by many who come to the village.

"Horticultural nursery", a sprawling nursery of department of horticulture, Uttarakhand is also situated at the entrance of Syanri village.

Nearby places of interest

"Dhari Devi Temple", situated on the banks of the river Alaknanda, is one of the most widely visited temples in the Garhwal district.

"Saunra Khal" is a nearby village with a vast meadow as the main attraction.

"Rudranath temple (Rood ka daanda)" (Daanda in local garhwali language means a "hill-top"). So, this temple as the name suggests, is located atop a hill that has a 360 degree view of the surrounding valleys. The temple is dedicated to Lord Shiva. The trail to the top is a completely isolated trek and due to its remote location, gives an  experience of wilderness. The main attraction of the temple is a 2-day village fair in the month of August on the auspicious festival of Janmashtami.

Caste and Communities

Primarily, the majority of inhabitants of Syanri village are "Pant", "Joshi", "Bhatt Brahmins" and "harijans". Caste bias or communal sentiments are absent in the village.

Villages in Rudraprayag district